Thierry Pomel (born 4 October 1957) is a French equestrian. He competed in two events at the 2000 Summer Olympics.

References

1957 births
Living people
French male equestrians
Olympic equestrians of France
Equestrians at the 2000 Summer Olympics
People from Saumur
20th-century French people